David E. Adelman is an American lawyer and academic. He currently serves as the Harry Reasoner Regents Chair at the University of Texas School of Law.

References

Year of birth missing (living people)
Living people
University of Texas School of Law faculty
American lawyers
Place of birth missing (living people)